The structure–conduct–performance (SCP) paradigm, first published by economists Edward Chamberlin and Joan Robinson in 1933, and developed by Joe S. Bain is a model in Industrial Organization Economics which offers a causal theoretical explanation for firm performance through economic conduct on incomplete markets. This model has had direct influence on subsequent Industrial Economics models such as Porter's five forces analysis.

According to the structure–conduct–performance paradigm, the market environment has a direct, short-term impact on the market structure. The market structure then has a direct influence on the firm's economic conduct, which in turn affects its market performance. Therein, feedback effects occur such that market performance may impact conduct and structure, or conduct may affect the market structure. Additionally, external factors such as legal or political interventions affect the market framework and, by extension, the structure, conduct and performance of the market.

References

External links
 Structure–conduct–performance paradigm at Policonomics

Industrial organization